Sean Henry is the Chief Executive Officer (CEO), President, and Alternate Governor of the National Hockey League's Nashville Predators. He has been with the Predators since September 7, 2010, as President and Alternate Governor, but assumed the role as CEO on December 1, 2015.

Previously Henry had served since 1999 with the Tampa Bay Lightning where he held the position of chief operating officer.

Henry, who is a graduate of the State University of New York, has his name engraved on the Stanley Cup for the Lightning’s championship in 2004.

Uncle of M3 Technology's COO Michael Caton.

A little known fact about Sean is the impact he had on of modern day HDTV.

References

External links
Nashville Pedators' profile

1968 births
Living people
Nashville Predators executives
Sports businesspeople
Stanley Cup champions
Stony Brook University alumni
Tampa Bay Lightning executives
American chief operating officers
American chief executives of professional sports organizations